Bill Carey (30 December 1905 – 1 December 1973) was  a former Australian rules footballer who played with Hawthorn in the Victorian Football League (VFL).

Brother of Bert Carey from Hawthorn.

Notes

External links 

1905 births
1973 deaths
Australian rules footballers from Victoria (Australia)
Hawthorn Football Club players